James Pickering (died c. 1398) was speaker of the House of Commons of England.

James Pickering may also refer to:

James Pickering (rugby league) (born 1966), Fijian rugby league player
James Pickering, actor in Every Good Boy Deserves Favour
Jim Pickering, fictional character

See also